David Knudsen (8 August 1875 – 3 July 1952) was a Norwegian actor. He made his stage debut on Den Nationale Scene in 1902, and played for the National Theatre from 1911 to 1960.

He made his film debut in 1925 in Himmeluret, and later participated in several films, including Kampen om tungtvannet from 1948.

He was decorated Knight, First Class of the Royal Norwegian Order of St. Olav in 1945.

References

External lminks
 

1875 births
1952 deaths
Male actors from Oslo
Norwegian male stage actors
Norwegian male film actors
Norwegian male silent film actors
20th-century Norwegian male actors